is a railway station in the city of Komaki, Aichi Prefecture,  Japan, operated by Meitetsu.

Lines

Station layout
The station has two opposed side platforms connected to the station building by a footbridge. The station has automated ticket machines, Manaca automated turnstiles and is unattended..

Platforms

Adjacent stations

|-
!colspan=5|Nagoya Railroad

Station history
It was closed in 1944, and reopened on March 10, 1965 under its present name. The platforms were rebuilt in March 2002.

Passenger statistics
In fiscal 2017, the station was used by an average of 4665 passengers daily.

Surrounding area
Tagata Jinja
Nagoya Keizai University

See also
 List of Railway Stations in Japan
 Hōnen Matsuri

References

External links

 Official web page 

Railway stations in Japan opened in 1931
Railway stations in Aichi Prefecture
Stations of Nagoya Railroad
Komaki